The Qwartz Electronic Music Awards recognize new and electronic music with awards and grants in music and technologies categories. An annual event takes place in Paris. The Qwartz Awards are presided by the pioneer Pierre Henry.
Besides the awards, Qwartz organizes an International New and Electronic Music Market, concerts, parties and conferences.
The Qwartz Awards recognize all aspects of contemporary art : music, audiovisual works and graphics, instruments, technological innovations, festivals, medias and new media arts. Pierre Henry, Derrick May, Laurie Anderson, Mathhew Herbert, Björk, Wolfgang Voigt, Otavio Henrique Soares Brandao, Ake Parmerud, Henri Pousseur, Can, Klaus Schulze, Lionel Marchetti in particular have already been awarded with a Qwartz d'Honneur.

Jury procedure
Selections are made by juries who select blind, without knowing the names of the artists or labels. After the juries nominate several releases or tracks in the different categories, Internet users are invited to listen to the nominated works and then vote for the prize-winners.

The awards categories
Awarded by the Juries
Album 
Experimentation/Research 
Discovery 
Compilation 
Track 
Dancefloor 
Artwork and Packaging 
New Media Arts (no longer awarded)
Artist 
Label

Awarded by management/honour committee
Qwartz d’Honneur
Qwartz Pierre Schaeffer
Qwartz Max Mathews (technological innovation)

Awarded by management/honour committee from 2015 Qwartz 10th years anniversary
Qwartz du Génie Musical
Qwartz de l'Innovation Musicale

2013 
(Paris - La Machine du Moulin Rouge)
Chairmanship: Jean-François Zygel (President of the Jury) 
Président d'Honneur: Richard Pinhas
Official Jury: Christophe Bourseiller, Nicolas Dufourcq, Bruno Letort, Laurent Tran Van Lieu, Thomas Valentin.
Professional Jury: Alix Clément, Manon Deruytere, Fabrice Fassnacht, Kevin Ringeval, Perrine Vincent.
Awards
Qwartz d'Honneur: Derrick May
Album: Sentimental Favourites LP de Andrew Pekler [Dekorder]
Expérimentation: 1-Bell Fantasia de Junya Oikawa [ZKM] 2-Oval DNA de Oval – [Shitkatapult]
Discovery: lucen de afarOne [karlrecords]
Track: Lente dépression de Arne Vinzon [dokidoki]
Qwartz Max Matthews: Le Dyskograf

2012 
(Paris - 104)

Chairmanship: Robert Henke / 
Juries' President : Monolake & Arnaud Rebotini 
Official Jury: Nicolas Dufourcq, Olaf Hund, David Jisse, Atau Tanaka.
Professional Jury: Sébastien Auger, Xavier Ehretsmann, Sixto Fernando, Thomas Régnault, Tommy Vaudecrane, Christophe Vix-Gras.
Awards
Album, Kilimanjaro by Superpitcher [Germany] – Kompakt [Germany]
xperimentation, 18 pieces for the Midi harp by Elisabeth Valletti [France] – No label
Discovery, Life on Titan by John Heckle [United Kingdom] - Mathematics Recordings [United States]
Track, Dernière minute by Andy Moor [United Kingdom] and Anne-James Chaton [France] in Transfer/1 Departures - Unsounds [Netherlands]
Dancefloor, Glass by Incite [Germany] in Dare to Dance – Hands productions [Germany]
Artwork/Packaging, Marc-Antoine Beaufils [France] for Semelles de fondation - Bloc Thyristors [France] / Bimbo Tower [France]
Qwartz d'Honneur, Morton Subotnick [United States]
Qwartz Pierre Schaeffer, Francis Dhomont [France]
Qwartz Max Mathews, Hopman Sound Transfer [France]
New Media Arts, Sound in Process : Lights contacts by Scenocosme (Grégory Lasserre & Anaïs met den Ancxt) [France]
RFI contest winners
Alexandre Navarro – France
Bérangère Maximin – France
Dan Charles Dahan – France
Didier Achtal – France
Djiiva, Marise Cardoso – Spain
Elisabeth Valletti – France
Felipe Otondo – Danemark
Franck Dadure – France
Gianluca Porcu – Italy
Hughes Germain – France
Jonathan Rogissart – France
Juan Crek – Spain
Manon Deruytere – France
Nicolas Cante – France
Panayiotis Kokoras – Greece
Sébastien Lavoie – Quebec
Théo Boulenger – France
Thomas Albiach – France
Yannick Franck – Belgium
Ybrid, Sylvie Egret – France

2011 
(Paris, La Cigale & Le Trianon)

Chairmanship: Alva Noto 
Juries: Presidents: Matali Crasset & Pierre Cornette de Saint-Cyr
Official Jury: Matali Crasset (President), Gilles Berquet, Mïrka Lugosi, Didier Varrod.
Professional Jury: Alexis Alyskewicz & Aurore Menu, Yannick Blay,  Frédéric Malki, Eric Mattson, Thomas Meinecke, Erik Minkkinen, Edouard Rostand, Christine Webster.
New Media Arts Jury: Pierre Cornette de Saint-Cyr (President), Gilles Alvarez, Charles Carcopino, Régine Debatty, Benoît Guérinault, Anne Roquigny, Gerfried Stocker, Alain Thibaut.

Awards
Album: Doll Divider by Olivia Louvel [France] - Optical Sound [France] 
Experimentation/Research: Antichamber by Yannis Kyriakides [Cyprus] - Unsounds [Netherlands] 
Discovery - Peste by Sturqen [Portugal] - Kvitnu [Ukraine] 
Compilation, A Man and A Machine 2 by Le Son du Maquis [France] 
Track, Fine Mouche by Khan (feat. Brigitte Fontaine) [Germany] – I’m a single Records [Germany] 
Dancefloor, The Beat of the Heart by Daniel Meteo [Germany] in Working Class, Shitkatapult [Germany] 
Artwork/Packaging, Loafnest (Andrew Lange + Michael S. Carlson) [United States] for Fever Dream by MAP 
Artist, Sturqen [Portugal] 
Label, Kvitnu [Ukraine] 
New Media Arts, Dust by Herman Kolgen [Canada] / Special Mention to Deshérence by ANTIVJ [France] 
Qwartzd'Honneur, Matthew Herbert [United Kingdom] 
Qwartz Pierre Schaeffer, Eliane Radigue [France] 
Qwartz Max Mathews, Harpe MIDI Camac [France] 
Qwartz, Special - Christine Groult by KM Pantin [France]

2010 
(Paris, Le Palais Brongiart)

Chairmanship: Gudrun Gut 
Jury's President: Alejandro Jodorowsky 
Official Jury: Christophe, Bernard Parmegiani, Patrice Renson
Professional Jury: Jocelyne Auzende, Alain Brohard, David Chauveau, Marek Choloniewski, Jean-Marc Clogenson, Hubert Michel, Damien Moreno, Kevin Ringeval, Remco Schuurbiers

Awards
Album: Fedayi Pacha - From the Oriental School of dub [Hammerbass]
Experimentation/Research: Hughes Germain - Esprit de sel [Volume-Collectif / Césaré] 
Discovery: Cercueil - Shoo Straight Shout [Optical Sound] 
Compilation: Alec Empire Plays Staubgold: Rauschgold (Staubgold) 
Anthology: Francisco López - Through the Looking-Glass (KAIROS)
Track: Fractional - Tansw extrait de Still Life [The Centrifuge] 
Dancefloor: Daniela La Luz - Elle Routine extrait de Musik Non Stop Uno [Syncopated Musik] 
Artwork/Packaging: Mounir Jatoum (La Commissure) - Split d’Arnaud Rivière & Antoine Chessex [Le Petit Mignon] 
New Media Art: Kurt Hentschläger
Artist: Arnaud Rebotini 
Label: Shitkatapult
Qwartz Max Mathews: Olivier Sens - logiciel Usine 
Qwartz Pierre Schaeffer: François Bayle 
Qwartz of Honneur: Laurie Anderson

2009 
(Paris, Le Cirque d'Hiver Bouglione)

Chairmanship: Taylor Deupree

Album: krill.minima / urlaub auf balkonien / Thinner Netlabel
Experimental/Research: Lionel Marchetti / Adèle et Hadrien: Le Livre des Vacances / Optical Sound
Discover: Pirata / Minimental / The Arrogance of Simplicity / Pueblo Nuevo Netlabel
Artwork & Packaging: skoltz_kolgen for Silent Room / ARCADI / Optical Sound
Video: skoltz_kolgen for Silent Room / ARCADI / Optical Sound
Track: Stefan Mallmann / Chicken and Wings in Interlude Ep / Night Drive Music
Dance-Floor: Apparat / "Fractales (Apparat Ibiza Version)" on Things To Be Frickled (2008)
Compilation: Autumn Leaves / Gruenrekorder
Artist: Lionel Marchetti
Label: Kompakt
Qwartz d'honneur: Wolfgang Voigt
Qwartz dierre Schaeffer: Åke Parmerud, Roger Cochini
Qwartz Max Mathews: Bert Schiettecatte / AudioCubes Percussa  (Belgium)
Web: Kenneth Goldsmith for UbuWeb
Press: Tony Herrington for the magazine The Wire 
Digital Arts: Maurice Benayoun

2008 
(Paris, Le Cirque d'Hiver Bouglione)

Présidence d'Honneur: Robin Rimbaud aka Scanner

Album: Edith Progue / Timeline / Mille Plateaux
Experimental/Research: Laurent Chambert  / Suspense
Discover: The Penelopes / The Arrogance of Simplicity / Citizen Records
Artist: LR & RadioMentale
Artwork & Packaging: Jon Wozencroft, for “l’album 4 Rooms”/Jacob Kirkegaard /Touch
Track:: Long tongue / Micro Audio Waves in odd size baggage / Magic Music
Dance-Floor: Cocotte / Teenage Bad Girl in Cocotte / Citizen Records
Compilation: 50 AÑOS (1956–2006) de Musica Electroacustica en Chile, Consejo Nacional de la Cultura y las Artes  / Pueblo Nuevo / 3 CDs /press1 /press2
Label: Citizen Records (France)
Hybrid: Naphtaline, Ez3kiel, Jarring Effects
Event: Les Nuits Electroniques de L’Ososphère (Strasbourg, France)
Qwartz d'honneur: Blixa Bargeld
Qwartz Pierre Schaeffer : Jean-Claude Risset, Beatriz Ferreyra, Max Mathews

2007 
(Paris, Le Cirque d'Hiver Bouglione)

Track: The Ukrainians / Bryce Kushnier / Intr-version (Canada)
Album: Dovetail / Coloma / Klein Records (Great Britain)
Discover: The correct use of pets / Hypo & Edh / Active Suspension (France)
Dance-Floor: Ripple effect / 20for7 / Chocoflash (Australia)
Experimental/Research: Shaper of form / Dani Joss / Poeta Negra (Greece)
Compilation: Bip_Hop generation vol.8 / Bip-hop (France)
Clip: Under the bridge / Baiyon / Brain Escape Sandwich / Rec-Catchpulse(Shinsuke Yamaji) (Japan) and SchnittMenge / Spenza / Stephan Bolch (Germany)
Artwork & Packaging: Olivier Weber  for Zombiparti ! de Kid Chocolat - Poor Records (Switzerland)
Artist: Coloma
Label: Staubgold (Germany)
Hybrid: Rodolphe Von Gombergh. RVG (France)
Event: Synch (Greece) and Nuits Sonores (Lyon, France)
Max Mathews: FM3 Buddha Machine (China/USA)
Robert Moog: Haliaetus (France)
Qwartz d'honneur: Björk
Qwartz Pierre Schaeffer: Henri Pousseur (Belgium) and Otavio Soares Brandão(Brazil)

2006 
(Paris, Le Cirque d'Hiver Bouglione)

Track: Sofa / Motel *** / Dazzle and Delight (France)
Album: No Waves / Micro Audio Waves / N Records (Portugal)
Discover: Scatter Scards / Andrey Kiritchenko / Minusn Netlabel (Ukraine) and 2 / Leonard de Leonard / Leonizer Records (France)
Dance-Floor: No fun (OK Cowboy) / Vitalic / Citizen Records (France)
Experimental/Research: Zap Meemees / Satanicpornocultshop / Sonore (Japan)
Compilation: Fax collaborations & remixes / Static Discos (Mexico)
Clip:: Fully Connected / Marco Madruga & Daniela Krts
Artwork & Packaging: Nicola Bork for "Mimetic Dancing" de Mimetic – Hands (Germany)
Promising artist: Murcof (Mexico)
Label: Tomlab (Germany)
Live Act: Felix Kubin (Germany)
DJ Producer: Helius Zhamiq
Hybrid: Mladafronta DVD – Parametric (France)
Arrangement & Composition: Vitalic (France)
Vinyl: "Vista le Vie" de A futuristic family film – F Communications (France)
Event: Dis-patch Beograd
Qwartz d'honneur: Pierre Henry (France), Klaus Schulze (Germany), Can (Germany)
Qwartz Pierre Schaeffer: Bernard Parmegiani

2005 
(Paris, Le Cabaret Sauvage)

Qwartz d'honneur: Pierre Schaeffer
Album: Welcome Tourist / B.Fleischmann / Morr Music (Germany-Austria)
Discover: The Exchange / Alix / Les Disques Sérieux/Nocturne (France)
Track: Escal in The Exchange / Alix / Les Disques Sérieux/Nocturne (France)
Vinyl: A heart & two stars / Music A.M / Quatermass (Germany-Belgium)
Compilation: Maximas Texturas / Discos Konfort (Mexico)
Remix & Reprise: High again in Tribute To Remixes / Brain Damage / Dub Wiser - Hammerbass (France)
Clip: Hey Bonus ! - Octet / Camille Henrot / Diamond Traxx/Metronomic (France)
Artwork & Packaging: January / Taylor Deupree / Photographe & Uison Design / Spekk (Japan)
Composer/Arrangement: Uwe Schmidt (Germany)
Live: Dzihan and Kamien - Crouch Records (Yugoslavia-Switzerland)
Label: Poeta Negra (Greece)
Artist: Coloma - Ware Records (Germany/England)
DJ Producer: Automat - Sounds Around Records (France)
Autoproduction: Des hauts & des bas / Lou / Ici (Londres-France)
Hybrid: Cocoon, Optical Sound (France)
Max Mathews: TUB X, Rémi Dury (France)
Robert Moog: Live [software], Ableton
Event: Festival MUTEK, Québec, Canada

References

External links
 Qwartz Electronic Music Awards official website

French music awards
Awards established in 2005